Daniel Gunnarsson (born April 15, 1992) is a Swedish professional ice hockey player. He currently plays for Västerås IK in the HockeyAllsvenskan (Allsv). He was selected in the fifth round, 128th overall, by the Minnesota Wild in the 2012 NHL Entry Draft.

Playing career
Gunnarsson originally played as a youth and made his professional debut with Leksands IF in the HockeyAllsvenskan during the 2009–10 season.

After two seasons in the Allsvenskan, Gunnarsson left to sign a top tier contract with Luleå HF on 20 April 2011. He made his debut in the Elitserien with Luleå HF during the 2011–12 season.

Career statistics

References

External links

1992 births
Living people
Falu IF players
Färjestad BK players
Karlskrona HK players
Leksands IF players
Luleå HF players
Minnesota Wild draft picks
Swedish ice hockey defencemen
VIK Västerås HK players